Happy Endings is the second studio album by American country music group Old Dominion. It was released on August 25, 2017, via RCA Nashville. In late 2017, the band hosted a dive bar tour in support of the record.

Critical reception
Stephen Thomas Erlewine of AllMusic wrote that "Since Happy Endings flows so easily, it may be easy to glide along with its slick surfaces, but a close listen reveals not only the sturdiness of the songs but the cleverness of the production", rating it 4 out of 5 stars. Cillea Houghton of Sounds Like Nashville reviewed the album with favor, stating that "The album finds them in a slightly more poignant place than on 2015's Meat and Candy, while still flaunting their clever personalities and unique songwriting style."

Commercial performance
The album debuted at No. 1 on Top Country Albums, selling 31,000 copies, and 41,000 equivalent album units when streaming and track sales are included. It also debuted on Billboard 200 at No. 7. It has sold 107,400 copies in the US as of February 2019.

Track listing 
Track listing from Rolling Stone.

Personnel
Adapted from AllMusic

Old Dominion
Matthew Ramsey - electric guitar, lead vocals, background vocals
Trevor Rosen - acoustic guitar, keyboards, background vocals
Whit Sellers - drums, percussion, background vocals
Geoff Sprung - bass guitar, synthesizer bass, background vocals
Brad Tursi - electric guitar, background vocals

Additional Musicians
Dave Cohen - keyboards
Kris Donegan - acoustic guitar, electric guitar
Ryan Gore - percussion, programming
Little Big Town - background vocals on "Stars in the City"

Charts

Album

Weekly charts

Year-end charts

Certifications

References 

2017 albums
Old Dominion (band) albums
RCA Records albums
Albums produced by Shane McAnally